Lineville is a city in Wayne County, Iowa, United States. The population was 195 at the time of the 2020 census.

Geography
Lineville is located at  (40.585289, -93.523177).

History
Lineville has been called the oldest town in Wayne County, but was not noted on early maps or in the 1850 state line survey, and probably attracted settlers from a nearby short-lived community called Grand River after the state line dispute was settled.  Lineville was platted in 1858.

Because part of the town is in Missouri and part in Iowa, it was named Lineville. The town square sits on the Iowa–Missouri border with the business on the south side of the square in South Lineville, Missouri.  When Wayne County was dry, liquor by the drink could be purchased at the bars on the Missouri side of the square.

During the 1968 Illinois earthquake, the quake was felt as a long shaking in Lineville. The quake damaged the town's water tower which began to leak 300 gallons of water an hour.

Lineville used to be part of ACL Community Schools for the three namesake towns of Allerton, Clio and Lineville until 1966 when Allerton voted to join with Cambria-Corydon Community Schools to form Wayne Community Schools.  Lineville and Clio then formed Lineville–Clio which survived until 2010.  All classes were held in Lineville.  It was one of the smallest school districts in the state of Iowa.  In 2010, the State of Iowa ordered Lineville–Clio closed as its small size and tax base made it impossible to meet State of Iowa educational standards. Lineville–Clio has since merged with Wayne Community Schools with all classes being held in Corydon (22 road miles away).

Transportation
Lineville is located on U.S. Route 65. The city is served by the Union Pacific Railroad, which was originally the CRI&P (Rock Island). Rail traffic has increased considerably on this line since it was purchased by the Union Pacific. Lineville once had rail passenger service, which was discontinued in the 1960s.

Demographics

2010 census
As of the census of 2010, there were 217 people, 108 households, and 60 families living in the city. The racial makeup of the city was 99.1% White, 0.5% Asian, and 0.5% from two or more races.

There were 108 households, of which 18.5% had children under the age of 18 living with them, 44.4% were married couples living together, 3.7% had a female householder with no husband present, 7.4% had a male householder with no wife present, and 44.4% were non-families. 39.8% of all households were made up of individuals, and 22.3% had someone living alone who was 65 years of age or older. The average household size was 2.01 and the average family size was 2.68.

The median age in the city was 48.2 years. 16.1% of residents were under the age of 18; 6% were between the ages of 18 and 24; 22.1% were from 25 to 44; 30.4% were from 45 to 64; and 25.3% were 65 years of age or older. The gender makeup of the city was 51.2% male and 48.8% female.

2000 census
As of the census of 2000, there were 273 people, 126 households, and 75 families living in the city. The racial makeup of the city was 99.63% White and 0.37% Pacific Islander.

There were 126 households, out of which 22.2% had children under the age of 18 living with them, 52.4% were married couples living together, 5.6% had a female householder with no husband present, and 39.7% were non-families. 36.5% of all households were made up of individuals, and 23.8% had someone living alone who was 65 years of age or older. The average household size was 2.17 and the average family size was 2.82.

In the city, the population was spread out, with 22.3% under the age of 18, 4.8% from 18 to 24, 23.8% from 25 to 44, 17.2% from 45 to 64, and 31.9% who were 65 years of age or older. The median age was 44 years. For every 100 females, there were 88.3 males. For every 100 females age 18 and over, there were 91.0 males.

The median income for a household in the city was $30,625, and the median income for a family was $35,357. Males had a median income of $31,094 versus $18,750 for females. The per capita income for the city was $18,414. About 18.1% of families and 24.0% of the population were below the poverty line, including 32.1% of those under the age of eighteen and 22.7% of those 65 or over.

Education
Wayne Community School District operates public schools serving the community.

It was in the Lineville–Clio Community School District until that district decided to disband in 2010. Lineville–Clio merged into Wayne on July 1, 2011.

Notable person 
 Irene Cozad (1888-1970), ragtime composer, born in Lineville

References

Cities in Iowa
Cities in Wayne County, Iowa
1858 establishments in Iowa